This is a list of state parks, reserves, forests and wildlife management areas (WMAs) in the Connecticut state park and forest system, shown in five tables. The first table lists state parks and reserves, the second lists state park trails, the third lists state forests, the fourth lists Wildlife Management Areas (WMAs) and the fifth lists other state-owned, recreation-related areas. It is possible to faintly view the Milky Way in 10 state parks.

Connecticut state parks

Connecticut state park trails

Connecticut state forests

Connecticut Wildlife Management Areas

Other state areas

See also
List of U.S. national parks

References

External links

Connecticut State Parks and Forests Connecticut Department of Energy and Environmental Protection

 
Connecticut state parks
State parks